Gobblers Knob is a  mountain summit located in Salt Lake County, Utah, United States.

Description
Gobblers Knob is the highest point in the Mount Olympus Wilderness, and is set on land managed by Wasatch National Forest. This peak is situated in the Wasatch Range which is a subset of the Rocky Mountains, and with Salt Lake City 12 miles to the west and Park City 10 miles to the east, it is a popular hiking destination. Neighbors include Mount Raymond 1.5 mile to the southwest and Kesler Peak is 3.2 miles to the south. Precipitation runoff from the mountain's north slope drains to Mill Creek, whereas the south slope drains to Big Cottonwood Creek.

History
This mountain's toponym was officially adopted in 1964 by the United States Board on Geographic Names. The landform's name "gobbler" refers to turkeys which miners of the Big Cottonwood Mining District tried raising when their mining income ceased, but this also failed as bobcats ate the turkeys. In 1904, the Baker mine on the northwest slope produced gold ore and copper.

See also

Gallery

References

External links

 Gobblers Knob: weather forecast
 National Geodetic Survey Data Sheet
 2016 fatality: Utahavalanchecenter.org

Mountains of Utah
Mountains of Salt Lake County, Utah
North American 3000 m summits
Wasatch-Cache National Forest
Wasatch Range